Paranigilgia morosa is a moth in the family Brachodidae. It was described by Alexey Diakonoff in 1948. It is found on the Moluccas and in New Guinea.

References

Natural History Museum Lepidoptera generic names catalog

Brachodidae
Moths described in 1948